Morali or Moralı may refer to:

People

Surname 
 Jacques Morali (1947–1991), French singer-songwriter
 Jonathan Morali (born 1980), musician and composer
 Laurent Morali (born 1975), French-born, US-based real estate developer
  (born 1957), association football coach

Given name
 Moralı Ali Pasha (died 1735), Ottoman statesman
 Moralı Ibrahim Pasha (died 1725), Ottoman statesman and grand admiral

Other uses 
 Moralı, Germencik